P. Sri Acharya (16 April 1886 – 28 October 1981) was a Tamil scholar, journalist and writer from Tamil Nadu, India.

Biography
Acharya was born in Thenthiruperai, Thoothukudi District in 1886 to Pichu Iyengar and Pichu Ammal. His full birth name was P. Srinivasacharya, which was later shortened to P. Sri Acharya and further to P. Sri. He was educated at MDT Hindu College, Tirunelveli. He was a friend of the nationalist poet Subramania Bharathi and under his influence become an independence activist. At the insistence of C. Rajagopalachari he started reading Tamil literature and it soon became his primary field of expertise. He also published a journal titled Grama Paribalanam (lit. Administration of Villages) briefly. Later he worked as a journalist for the journal Kumaran. At Kalki Krishnamurthy's invitation he joined Ananda Vikatan. He ended his journalistic career as the editor of Dina Mani. In 1965, he was awarded the Sahitya Akademi Award for Tamil for his biography of Ramanuja. He died in 1981.

Bibliography

Alliance Publishers
Arupadai Veedugal (6 Volumes)
Azhwargal Varalaaru (8 Volumes)
Divya Prabandha Saaram
Aruna Girinadhar
Kandhapurana Kadhaigal
Naradhar
Navarathiri Kadhaigal
Rajarishi Viswamithrar
Thayumanavar
Dasavathara Kadhaigal
Thulli Thirindha Kalathilae
Avvaiyar
Moonru Deepangal

Kannadasan Publishers
(Critical Commentaries)
Ramanum Muruganum
Manikkavasagarum Nammazhvarum
Kabirdasarum Thayumanavarum
Gandhiyum Leninum
Gandhiyum Vinobavum
Andalum Meeravum
Bharathiyum Tagorum
Valluvarum Socratesum
Nandanarum Thirupaanalwarum
Bharathi: Naan Kandathum Kettadhum

Kalaimagal Kariyalayam
Anbu Vazhartha Arivu Payir - Azhwargalum Acharyargalum
Paadum Bhaktha Manigal (9 Volumes)
Moovar Erriya Mozhivilakku
Thonda Kulamae thozhu kulam
Thuyil Ezhuppiya Thondar
Adi Soodiya Arasu
Bhagawanai Valartha Bhakthar

Unknown publisher
Thiruppavai
Thiruvembavai
Kuzhandhai Valarppu Murai 
Sivanesa Selvar
Thamizh valarndha Kadhai
Sri Ramanujar 1964, Sudhesamitran Publishers, Madras.

References

1886 births
1981 deaths
20th-century Indian journalists
Recipients of the Sahitya Akademi Award in Tamil
Tamil writers
People from Thoothukudi district
Journalists from Tamil Nadu
Indian Tamil people